Mikhail Aleksandrovich Okhitovich (1896—1937) was a Bolshevik sociologist, town planner and Constructivist architectural theorist, most famous for his 'Disurbanist' proposals of 1929-30.

Okhitovich, born in Saint Petersburg, joined the Bolshevik Party in 1917 and served in the Red Army from then until 1925. He became a supporter of the Left Opposition of Leon Trotsky, leading to his expulsion in 1928. He was readmitted to the Party in 1930, at which time his theories were garnering a great deal of attention. Disurbanism, which he propounded mainly via the OSA Group's journal SA, is a theory resembling Frank Lloyd Wright's Broadacre City: an abandonment of the metropolis in favour of a diffuse, partly agricultural but technologically advanced network. His proposals were, along with other OSA members, the basis of the rejected Magnitogorsk plan of 1930 and a 'Green City' competition of the same year. Le Corbusier's riposte to Okhitovich's proposals would become the Ville Radieuse.

In 1933 Okhitovich was reprimanded by the Communist Party and in 1935, a speech of his in which he defended Constructivism and attacked the Stalinist 'cult of hierarchy' and nationalism caused consternation. A campaign led by Karo Alabyan and Arkady Mordvinov led to his arrest the same year. He was sent to the Gulag, where he was shot in 1937.

References

 Hugh D. Hudson, Jr. Terror in Soviet Architecture: The Murder of Mikhail Okhitovich  Slavic Review Vol. 51, No. 3 (Autumn, 1992), pp. 448–467

1896 births
1937 deaths
Constructivist architects
Soviet architects
Urban theorists
Russian Trotskyists
Great Purge victims from Russia
Soviet Trotskyists